Websafe or Web-safe may refer to:

 Websafe colors, a palette of colors intended to be displayable on 256-color displays without dithering
 Websafe fonts, fonts used because they are likely to be present on a wide variety of computer systems

See also
 SafeWeb, a software that identifies malicious websites
 Web browser safety, protection for web browsers
 Web of trust, a concept in cryptography
 Cyber safe, safety aspects in the internet